The 1948 Pittsburgh Pirates season was the 67th season of the Pittsburgh Pirates franchise; the 62nd in the National League. The Pirates finished fourth in the league standings with a record of 83–71.

Offseason 
 December 8, 1947: Billy Cox, Gene Mauch and Preacher Roe were traded by the Pirates to the Brooklyn Dodgers for Hal Gregg, Vic Lombardi and Dixie Walker.

Regular season

Season standings

Record vs. opponents

Game log

|- bgcolor="ffbbbb"
| 1 || April 19 || @ Reds || 1–4 || Blackwell || Gregg (0–1) || — || 32,147 || 0–1
|- bgcolor="ccffcc"
| 2 || April 20 || Cubs || 3–2 || Sewell (1–0) || Meyer || — || 38,546 || 1–1
|- bgcolor="ffbbbb"
| 3 || April 21 || Cubs || 3–6 || Borowy || Bonham (0–1) || Chipman || 5,555 || 1–2
|- bgcolor="ccffcc"
| 4 || April 22 || Cubs || 3–0 || Riddle (1–0) || Rush || — || 38,546 || 2–2
|- bgcolor="ffbbbb"
| 5 || April 23 || @ Reds || 3–5 || Blackwell || Higbe (0–1) || Gumbert || 5,355 || 2–3
|- bgcolor="ccffcc"
| 6 || April 24 || @ Reds || 7–1 || Singleton (1–0) || Hughes || — || 10,385 || 3–3
|- bgcolor="ffbbbb"
| 7 || April 25 || @ Reds || 6–7 || Gumbert || Lombardi (0–1) || — ||  || 3–4
|- bgcolor="ccffcc"
| 8 || April 25 || @ Reds || 13–10 || Walsh (1–0) || Hetki || — || 28,086 || 4–4
|- bgcolor="ccffcc"
| 9 || April 29 || @ Cubs || 4–2 || Riddle (2–0) || Borowy || — || 6,637 || 5–4
|- bgcolor="ccffcc"
| 10 || April 30 || @ Cubs || 10–4 || Sewell (2–0) || Rush || Higbe (1) || 13,058 || 6–4
|-

|- bgcolor="ccffcc"
| 11 || May 1 || Reds || 7–2 || Ostermueller (1–0) || Hughes || — || 13,661 || 7–4
|- bgcolor="ccffcc"
| 12 || May 2 || Reds || 6–4 || Queen (1–0) || Blackwell || Lombardi (1) || 35,779 || 8–4
|- bgcolor="ccffcc"
| 13 || May 5 || Braves || 3–2 || Higbe (1–1) || Sain || — || 5,210 || 9–4
|- bgcolor="ffbbbb"
| 14 || May 6 || Giants || 2–9 || Poat || Bonham (0–2) || — || 14,542 || 9–5
|- bgcolor="ffbbbb"
| 15 || May 8 || Giants || 5–12 || Jansen || Lombardi (0–2) || Trinkle || 11,535 || 9–6
|- bgcolor="ffbbbb"
| 16 || May 9 || Dodgers || 2–14 || Branca || Singleton (1–1) || — ||  || 9–7
|- bgcolor="ccffcc"
| 17 || May 9 || Dodgers || 10–8 || Sewell (3–0) || Ramsdell || — || 40,797 || 10–7
|- bgcolor="ccffcc"
| 18 || May 10 || Dodgers || 4–2 || Riddle (3–0) || Palica || — || 11,355 || 11–7
|- bgcolor="ffbbbb"
| 19 || May 12 || Phillies || 0–5 || Donnelly || Bonham (0–3) || — || 11,664 || 11–8
|- bgcolor="ccffcc"
| 20 || May 13 || Phillies || 5–1 || Chesnes (1–0) || Leonard || Singleton (1) || 29,789 || 12–8
|- bgcolor="ffbbbb"
| 21 || May 14 || @ Cardinals || 1–2 || Pollet || Ostermueller (1–1) || — || 14,839 || 12–9
|- bgcolor="ffbbbb"
| 22 || May 15 || @ Cardinals || 3–8 || Brecheen || Riddle (3–1) || — || 10,086 || 12–10
|- bgcolor="ffbbbb"
| 23 || May 16 || @ Cardinals || 5–6 (10) || Pollet || Gregg (0–2) || — || 20,484 || 12–11
|- bgcolor="ccffcc"
| 24 || May 18 || @ Braves || 4–3 || Lombardi (1–2) || Voiselle || — || 19,181 || 13–11
|- bgcolor="ffbbbb"
| 25 || May 19 || @ Braves || 1–4 || Bickford || Sewell (3–1) || — || 15,978 || 13–12
|- bgcolor="ccffcc"
| 26 || May 20 || @ Braves || 13–0 || Riddle (4–1) || Barrett || — || 3,089 || 14–12
|- bgcolor="ccffcc"
| 27 || May 21 || @ Dodgers || 8–4 || Ostermueller (2–1) || Barney || Gregg (1) || 8,803 || 15–12
|- bgcolor="ccffcc"
| 28 || May 22 || @ Dodgers || 3–1 || Higbe (2–1) || Branca || — || 12,821 || 16–12
|- bgcolor="ffbbbb"
| 29 || May 23 || @ Giants || 1–2 || Jansen || Singleton (1–2) || — || 36,473 || 16–13
|- bgcolor="ffbbbb"
| 30 || May 25 || @ Phillies || 1–4 || Erickson || Riddle (4–2) || Rowe || 7,138 || 16–14
|- bgcolor="ffbbbb"
| 31 || May 27 || @ Phillies || 1–2 || Simmons || Higbe (2–2) || — || 13,839 || 16–15
|- bgcolor="ffffff"
| 32 || May 28 || Cardinals || 1–1 (6) ||  ||  || — || 24,029 || 16–15
|- bgcolor="ccffcc"
| 33 || May 29 || Cardinals || 7–3 || Chesnes (2–0) || Munger || — || 15,336 || 17–15
|- bgcolor="ccffcc"
| 34 || May 30 || Cardinals || 9–3 || Higbe (3–2) || Pollet || — ||  || 18–15
|- bgcolor="ccffcc"
| 35 || May 30 || Cardinals || 7–6 || Lombardi (2–2) || Staley || — || 33,584 || 19–15
|- bgcolor="ffbbbb"
| 36 || May 31 || @ Cubs || 3–4 || Rush || Higbe (3–3) || — ||  || 19–16
|- bgcolor="ccffcc"
| 37 || May 31 || @ Cubs || 4–2 || Riddle (5–2) || Chambers || — || 46,965 || 20–16
|-

|- bgcolor="ffbbbb"
| 38 || June 2 || Braves || 1–5 || Sain || Lombardi (2–3) || — || 25,710 || 20–17
|- bgcolor="ccffcc"
| 39 || June 3 || Braves || 5–3 || Higbe (4–3) || Voiselle || Singleton (2) || 9,767 || 21–17
|- bgcolor="ffbbbb"
| 40 || June 4 || Braves || 7–10 || Hogue || Gregg (0–3) || Voiselle || 37,355 || 21–18
|- bgcolor="ccffcc"
| 41 || June 5 || Braves || 8–7 || Lombardi (3–3) || Bickford || — || 11,397 || 22–18
|- bgcolor="ffbbbb"
| 42 || June 6 || Giants || 4–16 || Poat || Singleton (1–3) || — ||  || 22–19
|- bgcolor="ccffcc"
| 43 || June 6 || Giants || 4–3 || Riddle (6–2) || Trinkle || — || 36,496 || 23–19
|- bgcolor="ffbbbb"
| 44 || June 7 || Giants || 5–9 || Jones || Singleton (1–4) || — || 23,243 || 23–20
|- bgcolor="ccffcc"
| 45 || June 9 || Dodgers || 6–4 || Sewell (4–1) || Barney || Higbe (2) || 11,790 || 24–20
|- bgcolor="ccffcc"
| 46 || June 10 || Dodgers || 4–1 || Bonham (1–3) || Taylor || — || 30,344 || 25–20
|- bgcolor="ffbbbb"
| 47 || June 11 || Dodgers || 2–3 (13) || Branca || Lombardi (3–4) || Ramsdell || 10,233 || 25–21
|- bgcolor="ffbbbb"
| 48 || June 13 || Phillies || 7–8 || Dubiel || Higbe (4–4) || Heintzelman ||  || 25–22
|- bgcolor="ccffcc"
| 49 || June 13 || Phillies || 9–2 || Riddle (7–2) || Rowe || — || 30,385 || 26–22
|- bgcolor="ccffcc"
| 50 || June 15 || @ Giants || 2–0 || Ostermueller (3–1) || Hartung || — || 44,150 || 27–22
|- bgcolor="ccffcc"
| 51 || June 16 || @ Giants || 11–5 || Bonham (2–3) || Konikowski || — || 8,160 || 28–22
|- bgcolor="ccffcc"
| 52 || June 17 || @ Giants || 9–8 || Singleton (2–4) || Jansen || Higbe (3) || 13,556 || 29–22
|- bgcolor="ccffcc"
| 53 || June 18 || @ Phillies || 2–0 || Riddle (8–2) || Roberts || — || 13,501 || 30–22
|- bgcolor="ccffcc"
| 54 || June 19 || @ Phillies || 7–6 || Chesnes (3–0) || Dubiel || Higbe (4) || 7,555 || 31–22
|- bgcolor="ffbbbb"
| 55 || June 20 || @ Phillies || 0–9 || Leonard || Sewell (4–2) || — ||  || 31–23
|- bgcolor="ccffcc"
| 56 || June 20 || @ Phillies || 7–5 || Gregg (1–3) || Donnelly || Queen (1) || 23,810 || 32–23
|- bgcolor="ffbbbb"
| 57 || June 21 || @ Dodgers || 2–5 || Branca || Lombardi (3–5) || — || 28,404 || 32–24
|- bgcolor="ffbbbb"
| 58 || June 24 || @ Dodgers || 2–6 || Ramsdell || Chesnes (3–1) || — ||  || 32–25
|- bgcolor="ffbbbb"
| 59 || June 24 || @ Dodgers || 6–8 (8) || Barney || Riddle (8–3) || Roe || 24,745 || 32–26
|- bgcolor="ffbbbb"
| 60 || June 25 || @ Braves || 3–12 || Spahn || Ostermueller (3–2) || — || 25,587 || 32–27
|- bgcolor="ccffcc"
| 61 || June 26 || @ Braves || 7–1 || Bonham (3–3) || Voiselle || — || 31,490 || 33–27
|- bgcolor="ffbbbb"
| 62 || June 27 || @ Braves || 1–9 || Sain || Lombardi (3–6) || — || 17,648 || 33–28
|- bgcolor="ffbbbb"
| 63 || June 29 || @ Reds || 5–6 (14) || Raffensberger || Singleton (2–5) || — || 23,233 || 33–29
|-

|- bgcolor="ccffcc"
| 64 || July 1 || @ Reds || 5–2 || Ostermueller (4–2) || Wehmeier || — || 5,493 || 34–29
|- bgcolor="ffbbbb"
| 65 || July 2 || Cubs || 1–5 || Meyer || Chesnes (3–2) || — || 30,041 || 34–30
|- bgcolor="ccffcc"
| 66 || July 4 || Cubs || 5–1 || Sewell (5–2) || Borowy || Higbe (5) ||  || 35–30
|- bgcolor="ccffcc"
| 67 || July 4 || Cubs || 6–2 || Riddle (9–3) || Rush || — || 26,183 || 36–30
|- bgcolor="ccffcc"
| 68 || July 5 || Reds || 10–3 || Lombardi (4–6) || Fox || — ||  || 37–30
|- bgcolor="ffbbbb"
| 69 || July 5 || Reds || 4–6 || Gumbert || Bonham (3–4) || Fox || 32,029 || 37–31
|- bgcolor="ffbbbb"
| 70 || July 6 || Reds || 4–6 || Vander Meer || Queen (1–1) || Gumbert || 31,035 || 37–32
|- bgcolor="ccffcc"
| 71 || July 7 || @ Cardinals || 2–1 || Chesnes (4–2) || Brazle || — || 14,255 || 38–32
|- bgcolor="ccffcc"
| 72 || July 8 || @ Cardinals || 6–4 || Ostermueller (5–2) || Staley || Higbe (6) || 15,035 || 39–32
|- bgcolor="ffbbbb"
| 73 || July 9 || @ Cubs || 1–2 || Hamner || Riddle (9–4) || — || 14,506 || 39–33
|- bgcolor="ffbbbb"
| 74 || July 10 || @ Cubs || 2–4 || Schmitz || Sewell (5–3) || — || 19,873 || 39–34
|- bgcolor="ffbbbb"
| 75 || July 11 || @ Cubs || 0–1 || Meyer || Bonham (3–5) || — || 29,683 || 39–35
|- bgcolor="ccffcc"
| 76 || July 15 || Giants || 4–3 || Queen (2–1) || Hartung || — ||  || 40–35
|- bgcolor="ffbbbb"
| 77 || July 15 || Giants || 3–10 || Poat || Riddle (9–5) || — || 26,050 || 40–36
|- bgcolor="ffbbbb"
| 78 || July 17 || Giants || 5–6 || Konikowski || Higbe (4–5) || — || 16,071 || 40–37
|- bgcolor="ffbbbb"
| 79 || July 18 || Braves || 2–10 || Potter || Riddle (9–6) || — ||  || 40–38
|- bgcolor="ffbbbb"
| 80 || July 18 || Braves || 1–3 || Bickford || Bonham (3–6) || — || 34,116 || 40–39
|- bgcolor="ccffcc"
| 81 || July 19 || Braves || 1–0 || Ostermueller (6–2) || Sain || — || 28,115 || 41–39
|- bgcolor="ccffcc"
| 82 || July 20 || Phillies || 11–2 || Chesnes (5–2) || Simmons || — || 26,019 || 42–39
|- bgcolor="ffbbbb"
| 83 || July 21 || Phillies || 2–3 (10) || Rowe || Singleton (2–6) || — || 6,797 || 42–40
|- bgcolor="ccffcc"
| 84 || July 22 || Phillies || 5–3 || Sewell (6–3) || Bicknell || — ||  || 43–40
|- bgcolor="ffffff"
| 85 || July 22 || Phillies || 1–1 (5) ||  ||  || — || 14,107 || 43–40
|- bgcolor="ffbbbb"
| 86 || July 23 || Dodgers || 3–4 || Palica || Queen (2–2) || Behrman || 33,702 || 43–41
|- bgcolor="ffbbbb"
| 87 || July 25 || Dodgers || 6–7 || Erskine || Chesnes (5–3) || Palica ||  || 43–42
|- bgcolor="ccffcc"
| 88 || July 25 || Dodgers || 7–4 (8) || Singleton (3–6) || Barney || — || 39,204 || 44–42
|- bgcolor="ffbbbb"
| 89 || July 27 || @ Braves || 1–5 || Potter || Ostermueller (6–3) || — || 29,031 || 44–43
|- bgcolor="ffbbbb"
| 90 || July 28 || @ Braves || 2–8 || Bickford || Riddle (9–7) || — || 25,446 || 44–44
|- bgcolor="ffbbbb"
| 91 || July 29 || @ Braves || 1–2 || Voiselle || Queen (2–3) || — || 12,813 || 44–45
|- bgcolor="ccffcc"
| 92 || July 30 || @ Dodgers || 10–5 || Chesnes (6–3) || Branca || — || 31,278 || 45–45
|- bgcolor="ccffcc"
| 93 || July 31 || @ Dodgers || 5–2 || Higbe (5–5) || Behrman || Lombardi (2) || 15,633 || 46–45
|-

|- bgcolor="ffbbbb"
| 94 || August 6 || @ Giants || 6–7 || Poat || Ostermueller (6–4) || Jones || 6,544 || 46–46
|- bgcolor="ccffcc"
| 95 || August 7 || @ Giants || 5–4 (11) || Higbe (6–5) || Poat || — || 20,408 || 47–46
|- bgcolor="ffbbbb"
| 96 || August 8 || @ Giants || 2–6 || Jansen || Riddle (9–8) || Jones ||  || 47–47
|- bgcolor="ccffcc"
| 97 || August 8 || @ Giants || 5–4 || Chesnes (7–3) || Konikowski || — || 46,214 || 48–47
|- bgcolor="ccffcc"
| 98 || August 10 || Cubs || 5–1 || Gregg (2–3) || Rush || — || 21,256 || 49–47
|- bgcolor="ccffcc"
| 99 || August 11 || Cubs || 4–2 || Sewell (7–3) || Hamner || — || 4,652 || 50–47
|- bgcolor="ccffcc"
| 100 || August 12 || Cardinals || 3–2 || Lombardi (5–6) || Dickson || — || 26,004 || 51–47
|- bgcolor="ccffcc"
| 101 || August 13 || Cardinals || 5–4 || Chesnes (8–3) || Wilks || — || 34,893 || 52–47
|- bgcolor="ffbbbb"
| 102 || August 14 || Cardinals || 3–6 || Brecheen || Ostermueller (6–5) || — || 22,283 || 52–48
|- bgcolor="ffbbbb"
| 103 || August 15 || Cardinals || 3–8 || Wilks || Higbe (6–6) || — ||  || 52–49
|- bgcolor="ccffcc"
| 104 || August 15 || Cardinals || 5–4 || Bonham (4–6) || Dickson || — || 37,767 || 53–49
|- bgcolor="ffbbbb"
| 105 || August 16 || Reds || 2–5 || Vander Meer || Gregg (2–4) || — || 19,230 || 53–50
|- bgcolor="ccffcc"
| 106 || August 17 || Reds || 4–3 || Lombardi (6–6) || Blackwell || — || 25,929 || 54–50
|- bgcolor="ccffcc"
| 107 || August 18 || @ Cubs || 7–4 || Chesnes (9–3) || Meyer || Higbe (7) || 13,317 || 55–50
|- bgcolor="ccffcc"
| 108 || August 19 || @ Cubs || 2–1 || Sewell (8–3) || Lade || — || 10,853 || 56–50
|- bgcolor="ffbbbb"
| 109 || August 20 || @ Cardinals || 4–7 || Staley || Ostermueller (6–6) || Brazle || 21,580 || 56–51
|- bgcolor="ffbbbb"
| 110 || August 21 || @ Cardinals || 2–9 || Munger || Bonham (4–7) || — || 22,387 || 56–52
|- bgcolor="ccffcc"
| 111 || August 22 || @ Cardinals || 4–1 (10) || Riddle (10–8) || Dickson || Lombardi (3) || 18,578 || 57–52
|- bgcolor="ccffcc"
| 112 || August 24 || Dodgers || 9–1 || Chesnes (10–3) || Erskine || — || 38,265 || 58–52
|- bgcolor="ccffcc"
| 113 || August 25 || Dodgers || 12–11 || Main (1–0) || Erskine || — || 17,048 || 59–52
|- bgcolor="ccffcc"
| 114 || August 26 || Phillies || 11–4 || Sewell (9–3) || Heintzelman || Higbe (8) ||  || 60–52
|- bgcolor="ccffcc"
| 115 || August 26 || Phillies || 4–1 || Queen (3–3) || Leonard || Higbe (9) || 10,387 || 61–52
|- bgcolor="ccffcc"
| 116 || August 27 || Phillies || 4–3 || Higbe (7–6) || Leonard || — || 32,367 || 62–52
|- bgcolor="ffbbbb"
| 117 || August 28 || Phillies || 2–9 || Rowe || Ostermueller (6–7) || — ||  || 62–53
|- bgcolor="ffbbbb"
| 118 || August 28 || Phillies || 7–11 || Leonard || Bonham (4–8) || — || 14,286 || 62–54
|- bgcolor="ccffcc"
| 119 || August 29 || Braves || 6–1 || Chesnes (11–3) || Spahn || — ||  || 63–54
|- bgcolor="ccffcc"
| 120 || August 29 || Braves || 5–2 || Lombardi (7–6) || Voiselle || — || 30,276 || 64–54
|- bgcolor="ccffcc"
| 121 || August 30 || Braves || 2–1 || Ostermueller (7–7) || Sain || — || 33,174 || 65–54
|- bgcolor="ccffcc"
| 122 || August 31 || Giants || 5–4 || Riddle (11–8) || Poat || Higbe (10) || 30,386 || 66–54
|-

|- bgcolor="ffbbbb"
| 123 || September 1 || Giants || 1–3 || Kennedy || Bonham (4–9) || — || 33,946 || 66–55
|- bgcolor="ffbbbb"
| 124 || September 2 || Giants || 4–5 || Jansen || Chesnes (11–4) || — || 16,250 || 66–56
|- bgcolor="ffbbbb"
| 125 || September 3 || Cubs || 1–10 || Meyer || Queen (3–4) || — || 27,843 || 66–57
|- bgcolor="ccffcc"
| 126 || September 5 || Cubs || 7–3 || Sewell (10–3) || Borowy || — ||  || 67–57
|- bgcolor="ffbbbb"
| 127 || September 5 || Cubs || 3–11 || Lade || Riddle (11–9) || — || 25,569 || 67–58
|- bgcolor="ccffcc"
| 128 || September 6 || Cardinals || 2–1 || Chesnes (12–4) || Dickson || — ||  || 68–58
|- bgcolor="ccffcc"
| 129 || September 6 || Cardinals || 4–1 || Lombardi (8–6) || Munger || — ||  || 69–58
|- bgcolor="ccffcc"
| 130 || September 7 || Cardinals || 6–2 || Ostermueller (8–7) || Hearn || — || 36,136 || 70–58
|- bgcolor="ccffcc"
| 131 || September 8 || @ Reds || 5–1 || Bonham (5–9) || Fox || — || 12,436 || 71–58
|- bgcolor="ccffcc"
| 132 || September 9 || @ Reds || 6–1 || Riddle (12–9) || Walters || — || 2,002 || 72–58
|- bgcolor="ccffcc"
| 133 || September 11 || @ Cubs || 13–12 || Queen (4–4) || Chambers || Riddle (1) || 17,095 || 73–58
|- bgcolor="ccffcc"
| 134 || September 12 || @ Cubs || 7–3 || Sewell (11–3) || McCall || — || 27,967 || 74–58
|- bgcolor="ffbbbb"
| 135 || September 13 || @ Giants || 2–5 || Kennedy || Lombardi (8–7) || — || 33,372 || 74–59
|- bgcolor="ffbbbb"
| 136 || September 14 || @ Dodgers || 5–8 || Behrman || Ostermueller (8–8) || — ||  || 74–60
|- bgcolor="ffbbbb"
| 137 || September 14 || @ Dodgers || 3–7 || Taylor || Riddle (12–10) || — ||  || 74–61
|- bgcolor="ccffcc"
| 138 || September 15 || @ Giants || 8–3 || Bonham (6–9) || Jansen || — || 9,180 || 75–61
|- bgcolor="ccffcc"
| 139 || September 16 || @ Giants || 10–6 || Chesnes (13–4) || Koslo || — || 7,174 || 76–61
|- bgcolor="ffbbbb"
| 140 || September 17 || @ Braves || 2–6 || Sain || Lombardi (8–8) || — || 11,838 || 76–62
|- bgcolor="ffbbbb"
| 141 || September 18 || @ Braves || 1–2 || Spahn || Ostermueller (8–9) || — || 21,085 || 76–63
|- bgcolor="ffbbbb"
| 142 || September 19 || @ Phillies || 6–9 || Leonard || Main (1–1) || — ||  || 76–64
|- bgcolor="ffbbbb"
| 143 || September 19 || @ Phillies || 3–5 || Rowe || Higbe (7–7) || — || 15,713 || 76–65
|- bgcolor="ffbbbb"
| 144 || September 20 || @ Phillies || 2–5 || Roberts || Chesnes (13–5) || — || 2,884 || 76–66
|- bgcolor="ffbbbb"
| 145 || September 20 || @ Phillies || 4–7 || Possehl || Bonham (6–10) || — || 3,513 || 76–67
|- bgcolor="ccffcc"
| 146 || September 21 || @ Dodgers || 6–3 || Lombardi (9–8) || Barney || — || 10,882 || 77–67
|- bgcolor="ccffcc"
| 147 || September 22 || @ Dodgers || 5–1 || Sewell (12–3) || Taylor || — || 3,756 || 78–67
|- bgcolor="ffbbbb"
| 148 || September 24 || Reds || 3–4 || Wehmeier || Ostermueller (8–10) || Gumbert || 18,914 || 78–68
|- bgcolor="ccffcc"
| 149 || September 25 || Reds || 16–6 || Chesnes (14–5) || Blackburn || — || 7,766 || 79–68
|- bgcolor="ccffcc"
| 150 || September 26 || Reds || 8–6 || Sewell (13–3) || Gumbert || Lombardi (4) ||  || 80–68
|- bgcolor="ccffcc"
| 151 || September 26 || Reds || 8–5 (8) || Singleton (4–6) || Peterson || — || 26,483 || 81–68
|- bgcolor="ccffcc"
| 152 || September 29 || @ Cardinals || 2–1 || Lombardi (10–8) || Dickson || — || 5,977 || 82–68
|- bgcolor="ffbbbb"
| 153 || September 30 || @ Cardinals || 1–6 || Munger || Chesnes (14–6) || — || 2,060 || 82–69
|- bgcolor="ffbbbb"
| 154 || September 30 || @ Cardinals || 1–4 || Brecheen || Ostermueller (8–11) || — || 8,597 || 82–70
|-

|- bgcolor="ccffcc"
| 155 || October 1 || @ Reds || 2–1 || Higbe (8–7) || Cress || — || 1,162 || 83–70
|- bgcolor="ffbbbb"
| 156 || October 3 || @ Reds || 0–1 || Vander Meer || Lombardi (10–9) || — || 7,255 || 83–71
|-

|-
| Legend:       = Win       = Loss       = TieBold = Pirates team member

Opening Day lineup

Roster

Player stats

Batting

Starters by position 
Note: Pos = Position; G = Games played; AB = At bats; H = Hits; Avg. = Batting average; HR = Home runs; RBI = Runs batted in

Other batters 
Note: G = Games played; AB = At bats; H = Hits; Avg. = Batting average; HR = Home runs; RBI = Runs batted in

Pitching

Starting pitchers 
Note: G = Games pitched; IP = Innings pitched; W = Wins; L = Losses; ERA = Earned run average; SO = Strikeouts

Other pitchers 
Note: G = Games pitched; IP = Innings pitched; W = Wins; L = Losses; ERA = Earned run average; SO = Strikeouts

Relief pitchers 
Note: G = Games pitched; W = Wins; L = Losses; SV = Saves; ERA = Earned run average; SO = Strikeouts

Farm system

LEAGUE CHAMPIONS: Santa Rosa

Notes

References 
 1948 Pittsburgh Pirates at Baseball Reference
 1948 Pittsburgh Pirates at Baseball Almanac

Pittsburgh Pirates seasons
Pittsburgh Pirates season
Pittsburg Pir